The Cooreei Bridge over Williams River is a heritage-listed road bridge that carries Main Road across Williams River in Dungog, New South Wales, Australia. The property is owned by Transport for NSW. It was added to the New South Wales State Heritage Register on 20 June 2000.

History 

The Dare truss road bridge was built in 1905. It replaced an 1873 bridge of the same name which had been condemned due to its dangerous condition. It was designed and constructed under the direction of Commissioner and Principal Engineer for Roads and Bridges W. J. Hanna with W. Oakes as the contractor. The cost of the bridge, the iron being provided by the Government, was A£1,995.

Heritage listing 
Cooreei Bridge over Williams River was listed on the New South Wales State Heritage Register on 20 June 2000.

See also 

 Historic bridges of New South Wales
 List of bridges in Australia

References

Bibliography

Attribution

External links

New South Wales State Heritage Register
Road bridges in New South Wales
Articles incorporating text from the New South Wales State Heritage Register
Bridges completed in 1905
1905 establishments in Australia
Truss bridges in Australia
Dungog Shire
Wooden bridges in Australia